Mount St. Louis is a mountain on Arrowsmith Peninsula in Graham Land, Antarctica. It was first sighted and roughly charted in 1909 by the French Antarctic Expedition (FAE) under J.B. Charcot. Surveyed in 1948 by the Falklands Islands Dependencies Survey (FIDS) who named it for Canadian pilot Peter B. St. Louis.

Mountains of Graham Land
Loubet Coast